Peace Arch Park is an international park consisting of Peace Arch Historical State Park in the United States and Peace Arch Provincial Park in Canada. The park straddles the international boundary between the two countries at the extreme western end of the main contiguous section of the two countries' land border, between Blaine, Washington, United States, and Surrey, British Columbia, Canada, where it reaches Semiahmoo Bay of the Salish Sea on the continent's Pacific Coast. The park's central feature is the Peace Arch.

The park is located at the Peace Arch Border Crossing (also known as the Douglas Border Crossing), where Highway 99 in British Columbia and Interstate 5 in Washington State meet.

History
Border inspection services at what is now known as the Peace Arch Border Crossing long predated the 1921 construction of the Peace Arch.

The Peace Arch, dedicated in 1921, commemorates the Treaty of Ghent and the Rush-Bagot agreement ending the War of 1812, which "provided for peaceful resolution of U.S.—British disputes and an unguarded U.S./Canadian border." The United States side was established as a state park in 1931. The Canadian side was established as a provincial park on November 7, 1939.

COVID-19 pandemic
In response to the COVID-19 pandemic, the Canada–United States border was shut down for non-essential travel on March 21, 2020. Initially, the parks on both sides of the border continued to open, allowing visitors from both sides of the border to gather at the park. However, as the number of park visitors continued to increase, the Canadian side of the park was ordered to close on June 18, 2020. On November 8, 2021, the border reopened to non-essential travel for Canadians who received a COVID-19 vaccine.

Despite the closure of the Canadian side of the park, and to get around mandatory Canadian public health and quarantine requirements, some visitors on the Canadian side continued to cross the border by directly accessing Peace Arch Historical State Park from 0 Avenue in Surrey. Although the U.S. Customs and Border Protection allowed Canadian visitors to enter the American side of the park and return to Canada, Canada Border Services Agency required anyone crossing the international border to report to CBSA to avoid potential penalties or charges. In an interview with CBC News, an immigration attorney from Washington state cited that the 1814 Treaty of Ghent prevents the erection of a barrier on the boundary, as it stipulates that such an action would cause the entire US-Canada boundary governed by the treaty to revert to its pre-treaty status.

Peace Arch Park is one of the most common locations reported to have served for 2020–21 border weddings. Unlike other border crossings where weddings were held, Peace Arch allowed both sides to meet in the same location with no separation.

Recreation
Recreational activities include walking and picnicking as well as a playground for children. Visitors are allowed to explore both sides of the Canada–United States border inside the park, but are warned not to cross the boundary of the park to enter the adjacent country without being cleared to enter by the respective customs authority, as violators are subject to prosecution. Although no known cameras are in the park itself, United States Border Patrol agents in cars, on bikes, and on foot inside and steerable cameras on poles outside watch the park.

Events
The International Peace Arch Association (IPAA) (formerly the United States Canada Peace Anniversary Association) is a nonprofit association dedicated to the heritage and preservation of the international monument. The association hosts park events and activities including the annual International Sculpture Exhibition, which highlights the work of American and Canadian artists.

See also
Douglas, British Columbia
International Peace Garden

References

Further reading

External links

Peace Arch Provincial Park BC Parks
Peace Arch Historical State Park Washington State Parks and Recreation Commission
International Peace Arch Association (IPAA)

Canada–United States border
Peace parks
Parks in Surrey, British Columbia
Parks in Whatcom County, Washington
State parks of Washington (state)
Monuments and memorials in Washington (state)
Provincial parks of British Columbia
Transboundary protected areas
1939 establishments in British Columbia
Protected areas established in 1939
1939 establishments in Washington (state)
Interstate 5